Phillips is a common patronymic surname of English and Welsh origin that derives from the given name Philip.

Notable people with this surname include

A
A. A. Phillips (1900–1985), Australian critic
Aaron Phillips (disambiguation), multiple people
Abi Phillips (born 1994), English actress
Adam Phillips (disambiguation), multiple people
Adolfo Phillips (born 1941), Panamanian baseball player
Adrian Phillips (born 1992), American football player
Aimee Phillips (born 1991), New Zealand footballer
Áine Phillips (born 1965), Irish film director
A. L. Phillips, American football coach
Al Phillips (1920–1999), English boxer
Alan Phillips (disambiguation), multiple people
Albert Phillips (disambiguation), multiple people
Alex Phillips (disambiguation), multiple people
Alexandra Phillips (disambiguation), multiple people
Alfred Phillips (disambiguation), multiple people
Alison Phillips (born 1970), British journalist
Allan Phillips, Venezuelan composer
Allan Robert Phillips (1914–1996), American ornithologist
Alma Rock Phillips (1895–1930), Australian actress
Almarin Phillips (1925–2006), American economist
Amanda Phillips (born 1981), Australian weightlifter
Ammi Phillips (1788–1865), American painter
Amy Phillips (disambiguation), multiple people
Amyas Phillips (1891–1962), English antique dealer
Anastasia Phillips, Canadian actress
Andre Phillips (born 1959), American track and field athlete
Andrea Phillips (born 1974), American game designer
Andrew Phillips (disambiguation), multiple people
Andy Phillips (disambiguation), multiple people
Angela Phillips, British journalist
Angie Phillips, British meteorologist
Anita Phillips (born 1945), Australian politician
Ann C. Phillips, American admiral
Anna Phillips (disambiguation), multiple people
Anna Lise Phillips (born 1975), Australian actress
Anne Phillips (disambiguation), multiple people
Anthony Phillips (disambiguation), multiple people
Anton Phillips (born 1943), Jamaican-British actor
Anwar Phillips (born 1982), American football player
Anya Phillips (1955–1981), American fashion designer
Arianne Phillips (born 1963), American costume designer
Arlene Phillips (born 1943), English choreographer
Art Phillips (1930–2013), Canadian politician
Art Phillips (composer) (born 1955), American music composer
Arthur Phillips (born 1969), American novelist
Arthur Phillips (musician) (1605–1695), English musician and composer
Arturo Aldunate Phillips (1902–1985), Chilean poet
Ary Phillips, American basketball coach
Ashley Phillips (disambiguation), multiple people
Augustine Phillips (??–1605), English actor
Augustus Phillips (1874–1944), American actor
Aunty Jean Phillips, Australian religious figure
Autumn Phillips (born 1978), American-English royal
A'yana Keshelle Phillips (born 1995), Virgin Island model
Ayotunde Phillips (born 1949), Nigerian judge

B
Baker Phillips (1718–1745), English lieutenant
Barnaby Phillips (born 1968), English television correspondent
Barney Phillips (1913–1982), American actor
Barre Phillips (born 1934), American musician
Barry Phillips, American musician
Belinda Phillips (born 1958), Jamaican swimmer
Ben Phillips (disambiguation), multiple people
Bert Phillips (disambiguation), multiple people
Bertram Phillips, British film director
Biddy Phillips (1956–2010), Irish camogie player
Bijou Phillips (born 1980), American actress
Bill Phillips (disambiguation), multiple people
Billy Phillips (born 1956), American soccer player
B. J. Phillips, American magazine editor
Bob Phillips (born 1951), American television journalist
Bob Phillips (basketball) (1917–1992), American basketball player
Bobbie Phillips (born 1968), American actress
Bobby Phillips (born 1975), American basketball player
Bobby Phillips (American football) (born 1969), American football player
Brad Phillips (disambiguation), multiple people
Brandon Phillips (born 1981), American baseball player
Brenda Phillips (born 1958), Zimbabwean field hockey player
Brendon Phillips (born 1954), Jamaican footballer
Brenton Phillips (born 1962), Australian rules footballer
Brett Phillips (born 1994), American MLB player
Brett Phillips (rugby league) (born 1988), Scottish international
Brewer Phillips (1924–1999), American guitarist
Brian Phillips (disambiguation), multiple people
Brice Phillips, American radio operator
Britta Phillips (born 1963), American singer-songwriter
Bruce Phillips (footballer) (1929–2014), Australian rules footballer
Bruce Phillips (journalist) (1930–2014), Canadian television journalist
Bryn Phillips (1900–1980), Welsh rugby union footballer
Bubba Phillips (1928–1993), American baseball player
Bud Phillips (born 1950), American politician
Bum Phillips (1923–2013), American football coach
Burrill Phillips (1907–1988), American composer
Burt Phillips, American disc jockey
Burton Phillips (1912–1999), American criminal
Buz Phillips (1904–1964), American baseball player

C
Callum Phillips (born 1992), Scottish rugby league footballer
Cam Phillips (born 1995), American football player
Cameron Phillips (broadcaster) (born 1969), Canadian broadcaster
Carl Phillips (born 1959), American writer
Carly Phillips (born 1965), American author
Caroline Phillips (disambiguation), multiple people
Carroll Phillips (born 1992), American football player
Carter Phillips (born 1988), American poker player
Caryl Phillips (born 1958), Kittitian-British novelist
Carys Phillips (born 1992), Welsh rugby union footballer
Cat Phillips (born 1991), Australian rules footballer
Catherine Payton Phillips (1727–1794), Quaker Minister
Cathy Phillips (born 1960), Canadian ice hockey player
C. E. S. Phillips (1871–1945), British physicist
Channing D. Phillips (born 1958), American attorney
Channing E. Phillips (1928–1987), American minister and activist
Charisse Phillips, American diplomat
Charles Phillips (disambiguation), multiple people
Cheryl Phillips (disambiguation), multiple people
Chester Arthur Phillips (1882–1976), American academic administrator
Chichester Phillips (1647–1728), English politician
Chris Phillips (disambiguation), multiple people
Christopher Phillips (disambiguation), multiple people
Chynna Phillips (born 1968), American singer and actress
Ciara Phillips (born 1976), Canadian-Irish artist
Claiborne Hooper Phillips (1847–1886), American politician
Claire Phillips (1907–1960), American spy
Claire Phillips (artist) (born 1963), English artist
Clara Phillips (1898–1969), American showgirl
Clarence Phillips (disambiguation), multiple people
Clark Phillips III (born 2001), American football player
Claude Phillips (1846–1924), British writer
Clyde Phillips (disambiguation), multiple people
Coles Phillips (1880–1927), American illustrator
Colin Phillips, British psycholinguist
Conor Phillips (born 1999), Irish rugby union footballer
Conrad Phillips (1925–2016), British actor
Constantine Phillips (1746–1811), English cricketer
Courtney Phillips, English actor
Craig Phillips (born 1971), British television personality
Craig Phillips (sports administrator) (born 1960), Australian athletic administrator
Curran Phillips (born 2000), American artistic gymnast
Cynthia Phillips (disambiguation), multiple people

D
Damaris Phillips (born 1980), American chef
Damon Phillips, American entrepreneur
Dan Phillips, American architect
Daniel Phillips (disambiguation), multiple people
Darius Phillips (born 1996), American football player
Dashaun Phillips (born 1991), American football player
Dave Phillips (disambiguation), multiple people
David Phillips (disambiguation), multiple people
Dayton E. Phillips (1910–1980), American politician
Dean Phillips (born 1969), American politician and businessman
Debbie Phillips (born 1969), American politician
Deborah Phillips (born 1965), Scottish painter
Dee Phillips (1919–2004), American baseball player
Delores Phillips (1950–2014), American author
Del'Shawn Phillips (born 1996), American football player
Demar Phillips (born 1983), Jamaican footballer
Dennis Phillips (disambiguation), multiple people
Derek Phillips (disambiguation), multiple people
Dewey Phillips (1926–1968), American disc jockey
Dewi Zephaniah Phillips (1934–2006), Welsh philosopher
Dick Phillips (1931–1998), American baseball player and coach
Dillon Phillips (born 1995), English footballer
Dode Phillips (1900–1965), American football player and coach
Dom Phillips (1964–2022), British journalist
Donald Phillips (disambiguation), multiple people
Dorothy Phillips (1889–1980), American actress
Dorothy J. Phillips (born 1945), American chemist
Doug Phillips (disambiguation), multiple people
Dudley Phillips (1905–1953), South African cricketer
Duncan Phillips (disambiguation), multiple people
Dwight Phillips (born 1977), American long-jumper

E
Earl Norfleet Phillips (born 1940), American diplomat
Ed Phillips (disambiguation), multiple people
Eddie Phillips (disambiguation), multiple people
Edgar Phillips (1889–1962), Welsh poet
Edmund Phillips (1932–2020), English cricketer
Edna Phillips (1907–2003), American harpist
Edward Phillips (disambiguation), multiple people
Edwin Percy Phillips (1884–1967), South African botanist
E. F. Phillips (1878–1951), American beekeeper
Elaine Phillips, American politician
Elijah Phillips (1809–1832), American settler
Eliza Phillips (1823–1916), English activist
Elizabeth Phillips (disambiguation), multiple people
Elmer Phillips (1901–1956), Guyanese cricketer
Eluned Phillips (1914–2009), Welsh poet
Emyr Phillips (born 1987), Welsh rugby league footballer
Eric Phillips (disambiguation), multiple people
Erin Phillips (born 1985), Australian athlete
Ernie Phillips (disambiguation), multiple people
Esther Phillips (1935–1984), American singer
Esther Phillips (poet) (born 1950), Barbadian poet
Ethan Phillips (born 1955), American actor
Evan Phillips (born 1994), American baseball player

F
Fiona Phillips (born 1961), English journalist
Fiona Phillips (politician) (born 1970), Australian politician
Flip Phillips (1915–2001), American saxophonist
Forrest Phillips (1887–1972), Canadian farmer and politician
Frank Phillips (disambiguation), multiple people
Freddie Phillips (1919–2003), British musician and composer
Frederick Phillips (disambiguation), multiple people
Fremont O. Phillips (1865–1936), American lawyer and politician

G
Gail Phillips (1944–2021), American businesswoman and politician
Gareth Phillips, Welsh actor
Garry Phillips (born 1968), Australian rules footballer
Gary Phillips (disambiguation), multiple people
Garyn Phillips (born 2001), Welsh rugby union footballer
Gene Phillips (disambiguation), multiple people
Geoff Phillips, Australian television presenter
Geoffrey Phillips (born 1931), English cricketer
George Phillips (disambiguation), multiple people
Gerald Phillips (1886–1938), Welsh cricketer
Gerry Phillips (born 1940), Canadian politician
G. Godfrey Phillips (1900–1965), British barrister
Giles Phillips (born 1997), American soccer player
Gin Phillips, American author
Gladys Phillips (1912–2000), American politician
Glenda Phillips (born 1945), British swimmer
Glenn Phillips (disambiguation), multiple people
Gordon Phillips (disambiguation), multiple people
Graham Phillips (disambiguation), multiple people
Grant-Lee Phillips (born 1963), American singer-songwriter
Greg Phillips (born 1959), Australian rugby league player
Gregg Phillips (born 1960), American civil servant
Gregory A. Phillips (born 1960), American lawyer and judge
Gretchen Phillips (born 1963), American singer-songwriter
Gunner Phillips, British soldier

H
Harold Phillips (disambiguation), multiple people
Harper Phillips (born 1973), American skier
Harrison Phillips (born 1996), American football player
Harry Phillips (disambiguation), multiple people
Hawthorne Phillips (1914–1975), American judge
Hayden Phillips (born 1943), English civil servant
Hayden Phillips (field hockey) (born 1998), New Zealand field hockey player
Hazel Phillips (born 1929), English singer
H. D. Phillips (??–1892), British civil servant
Heath Phillips (born 1982), American baseball player and coach
Heather Phillips, American soprano
Hec Phillips (1889–1948), Canadian athlete
Helen Phillips (disambiguation), multiple people
Henry Phillips (disambiguation), multiple people
Herbert Phillips (disambiguation), multiple people
Herbie Phillips (1935–1995), American trumpeter
Hermon Phillips (1903–1986), American sprinter
Hesler Phillips (born 1978), Honduran footballer
Hilary Phillips (born 1951), Jamaican attorney
Holly Phillips (born 1969), Canadian writer
Homer G. Phillips (1880–1931), American lawyer
Hooty Phillips, American baseball player
Horace Phillips (disambiguation), multiple people
Horatio Frederick Phillips (1845–1924), English pioneer
Howard Phillips (disambiguation), multiple people
Hubert Phillips (1891–1964), British economist
Hugh Phillips (disambiguation), multiple people
Hughie Phillips (1864–??), English footballer

I
Ian Phillips (born 1959), Scottish footballer
Ian Phillips (philosopher), British philosopher
Idris Phillips (1958–2022), American musician
Ifan Phillips (born 1996), Welsh rugby union footballer
Irna Phillips (1901–1973), American actress
Irvin Phillips (born 1960), American football player
Irvine Phillips (1905–1999), American football player
Irving Phillips (1904–2000), American cartoonist
Irving Henry Webster Phillips Sr. (1920–1993), American photojournalist
Isa Phillips (born 1984), Jamaican hurdler
Isaac Phillips, American songwriter
Isaak Phillips (born 2001), Canadian ice hockey player
Ivor Phillips, English rugby union footballer
Ivor Phillips (cricketer) (born 1935), South African cricketer and tennis player

J
J. Phillips (baseball), American baseball coach
Jack Phillips (disambiguation), multiple people
Jacob Phillips (born 1999), American football player
Jaelan Phillips (born 1999), American football player
Jamel Phillips (born 1989), birth name of American rapper ASAP Twelvyy
James Phillips (disambiguation), multiple people
Jarred Phillips (born 1995), Canadian soccer player
Jason Phillips (disambiguation), multiple people
Jayne Anne Phillips (born 1952), American novelist
Jeanne Phillips (born 1942), American advice columnist
Jeff Phillips (disambiguation), multiple people
Jenny Phillips (1942–2018), American filmmaker
Jeremiah Phillips (1812–1879), American missionary
Jeremy Phillips (born 1951), British academic
Jermaine Phillips (born 1979), American football player
Jess Phillips (disambiguation), multiple people
Jesse Phillips (disambiguation), multiple people
J. F. V. Phillips (1899–1987), South African botanist
Jill Phillips (born 1976), American Christian musician
Jim Phillips (disambiguation), multiple people
Jimmy Phillips (disambiguation), multiple people
J. J. Phillips (born 1944), American poet
Jock Phillips (born 1947), New Zealand historian
Joel Daniel Phillips (born 1989), American artist
John Phillips (disambiguation), multiple people
Joker Phillips (born 1963), American football player and coach
Jonas Phillips (1736–1803), American soldier and merchant
Jonathan Phillips (disambiguation), multiple people
Jonny Phillips (disambiguation), multiple people
Jordan Phillips (born 1992), American football player
Jordanna Phillips (born 1990), Canadian-Guyanese footballer
Josh Phillips (disambiguation), multiple people
Josiah Phillips (1830–1894), American soldier
Jourdana Phillips (born 1990), American model
J. R. Phillips (born 1970), American baseball player
Juanita Phillips (born 1963), Australian journalist
Juanita Maxwell Phillips (1880–1966), Chilean politician
Judith Phillips (born 1959), British professor
Julia Phillips (disambiguation), multiple people
Julianne Phillips (born 1960), American actress
Julie Phillips, American writer
Justin Phillips (disambiguation), multiple people
J. V. L. Phillips (1922–2012), Ghanaian civil servant

K
Kaitlyn Phillips (born 1997), Australian rugby league footballer
Kalvin Phillips (born 1995), English footballer
Karen Phillips (born 1966), Australian swimmer
Kate Phillips (born 1989), British actress
Katharine Phillips, American psychiatrist
Katherine Phillips, American educator
Katherine W. Phillips (1972–2020), American business theorist
Kathleen Phillips, Canadian actress
Keenan Phillips (born 2000), South African footballer
Keith Phillips (1915–1974), Australian rugby league footballer
Kenny Phillips (born 1986), American football player
Kenny Phillips (American football coach) (1959–2015), American football coach
Kevin Phillips (disambiguation), multiple people
Kieran Phillips (disambiguation), multiple people
Kim Phillips (born 1966), American football player
Kimberly Phillips, Canadian writer
Kira Phillips (born 1995), Australian rules footballer
Kirk Phillips (born 1960), American football player
Krista Phillips (born 1988), Canadian basketball player
Kristian Phillips (born 1990), Welsh rugby union footballer
Kyle Phillips (disambiguation), multiple people
Kyler Phillips (born 1995), American mixed martial artist
Kyra Phillips (born 1968), American journalist

L
Lami Phillips, Nigerian-American singer
Lanette Phillips, American film producer
Lanier W. Phillips (1923–2012), American oceanographer
Larry Phillips (disambiguation), multiple people
Laughlin Phillips (1924–2010), American museum director
Lauren Phillips (born 1981), Welsh actress
Lauren Phillips (American actress), American pornographic actress
Lawrence Phillips (1975–2016), American football player
Lawrence S. Phillips (1927–2015), American businessman
Layn R. Phillips (born 1952), American judge
Lazarus Phillips (1895–1986), Canadian lawyer and politician
Lee Phillips (disambiguation), multiple people
Lefty Phillips (1919–1972), American baseball coach and executive
Lefty Phillips (Negro leagues) (1918–??), American baseball player
Leigh Phillips (born 1973), Welsh composer
Len Phillips (disambiguation), multiple people
Lena Madesin Phillips (1881–1955), American lawyer
Leon Phillips (disambiguation), multiple people
Leonard Phillips (1870–1947), New Zealand politician
Les Phillips (born 1963), English footballer
Leslie Phillips (disambiguation), multiple people
Liam Phillips (born 1989), British cyclist
Lincoln Phillips (born 1941), Trinidadian footballer
Linda Phillips (disambiguation), multiple people
Lindsay Phillips (born 1984), American entrepreneur
Lionel Phillips (1855–1936), British-South African financier
Lisa Phillips (disambiguation), multiple people
Liz Phillips (born 1951), American artist
Lloyd Phillips (1945–2013), South African-New Zealand film producer
Lockwood Phillips (born 1948), American radio personality
Logan Phillips (born 1982), American politician
Louis Phillips (disambiguation), multiple people
Lovell Phillips, English clergy
Loyd Phillips (1945–2020), American football player
Luke Phillips (born 1975), Australian rugby league footballer and referee
L. Vance Phillips (1858–before 1951), American artist

M
Mac Phillips (1898–1963), Canadian politician
Mackenzie Phillips (born 1959), American singer and actress
Macon Phillips (born 1978), American public servant
Maddie Phillips (born 1994), Canadian actress
Maekiaphan Phillips, Virgin Islander activist
Maggie Phillips (born 1951), British rower
Malcolm Phillips (born 1935), English rugby union footballer
Marc Phillips (born 1953), Welsh politician
Marcus Phillips (disambiguation), multiple people
Margaret Phillips (disambiguation), multiple people
Marie Phillips (born 1976), British writer
Mar-Jana Phillips (born 1995), Filipino-American volleyball player
Mark Phillips (disambiguation), multiple people
Markus Phillips (born 1999), Canadian ice hockey player
Marr Phillips (1857–1928), American baseball player
Martin Phillips (disambiguation), multiple people
Marvin Phillips (born 1983), American basketball player
Mary Phillips (disambiguation), multiple people
Matthew Phillips (disambiguation), multiple people
Maude Gillette Phillips (1860–??), American author and educator
Maureen Phillips, Trinidadian cricketer
McCandlish Phillips (1927–2013), American journalist
Meg Phillips (born 1996), Australian cricketer
Mel Phillips (born 1942), American football player
Melanie Phillips (born 1951), British journalist and writer
Melba Phillips (1907–2004), American physicist
Merilyn Phillips (born 1957), Caymanian cyclist
Merle Phillips (1928–2013), American politician
Merlyn Phillips (1896–1978), Canadian ice hockey player
Michael Phillips (disambiguation), multiple people
Michelle Phillips (born 1944), American singer-songwriter
Mikael Phillips, Jamaican politician
Mike Phillips (disambiguation), multiple people
Monifa Phillips, British physicist
Montague Phillips (1885–1969), British composer
Morgan Phillips (disambiguation), multiple people
Morris Mondle Phillips (1870–1948), Australian lawyer
Moses Phillips, American baseball player
Moses Dresser Phillips (1813–1859), American publisher
Mouche Phillips (born 1973), Australian actress
M. Penn Phillips (1887–1979), American entrepreneur
Muriel Phillips (1921–2022), American soldier
Murray Phillips, Australian professor
Myrna Phillips (born 1942), Canadian politician

N
Nathan Phillips (disambiguation), multiple people
Nathaniel Phillips (born 1997), English footballer
Neal Phillips (born 1956), Barbadian cricketer
Nelson Phillips (1873–1939), American judge
Nevada Phillips (born 1957), Barbadian-English cricketer
Nicholas Phillips (disambiguation), multiple people
Nikki Phillips (disambiguation), multiple people
Noah J. Phillips (born 1978), American attorney
Noel Phillips (1883–1961), Welsh cricketer
Noel Phillips (tennis) (born 1950), Australian tennis player
Norah Phillips (1910–1992), British politician
Norbert Phillips (1896–1961), Australian cricketer
Norman Phillips (disambiguation), multiple people
Norris Phillips (1916–1996), American baseball player
N. Scott Phillips, American politician
N. Taylor Phillips (1868–1955), American lawyer and politician

O
Oliver Phillips (ecologist), British ecologist
Ollie Phillips (disambiguation), multiple people
Omar Phillips (born 1986), West Indian cricketer
Orie Leon Phillips (1885–1974), American judge
Orlando Phillips (born 1960), American basketball player
Orville Howard Phillips (1924–2009), Canadian politician
Ossie Phillips, Australian jockey
Owen Phillips (disambiguation), multiple people
Overton Phillips (1908–1999), American race car driver

P
Pat Phillips (1927–1994), Australian rules footballer
Patricia Phillips, Canadiana actress
Patrick Phillips (born 1970), American poet
Paul Phillips (disambiguation), multiple people
Paulette Phillips (born 1956), Canadian artist
Pauline Phillips (1918–2013), American columnist
Paulo Laserna Phillips (born 1953), Colombian journalist
Percy Phillips (disambiguation), multiple people
Peter Phillips (disambiguation), multiple people
Peg Phillips (1918–2002), American actress
Pharez Phillips (1855–1914), Australian politician
Phil Phillips (1926–2020), American singer-songwriter
Philip Phillips (disambiguation), multiple people
Pierce Phillips (born 1992), English rugby union footballer
Porsha Phillips (born 1988), American basketball player
Preson Phillips (born 1980), American musician
Pruvin Phillips (??–2005), English priest
Pup Phillips (1895–1953), American football player and coach

R
Ralph Phillips (disambiguation), multiple people
Randy Phillips (disambiguation), multiple people
Rashad Phillips (born 1978), American basketball player
Raúl Aldunate Phillips (1906–1979), Chilean writer
Ray Phillips (disambiguation), multiple people
Red Phillips (baseball) (1908–1988), American baseball player
Redmond Phillips (1912–1993), New Zealand actor
Reginald Phillips (disambiguation), multiple people
Reuben Phillips (disambiguation), multiple people
Rhys Phillips (born 1988), New Zealand cricketer
Ricardo Phillips (born 1975), Panamanian footballer
Ricey Phillips (1920–2008), South African cricketer
Richard Phillips (disambiguation), multiple people
Richie Phillips (1940–2013), American lawyer
Ricky Phillips (born 1952), American guitarist
Rita Phillips, British sculptor
Robert Phillips (disambiguation), multiple people
Robin Phillips (1940–2015), English actor and film director
Rod Phillips (disambiguation), multiple people
Rodney Phillips (1942–1969), New Zealand chess player
Rog Phillips (1909–1965), American writer
Roger Phillips (disambiguation), multiple people
Ronald Phillips (disambiguation), multiple people
Ronnie Phillips (1947–2002), English footballer
Rory Phillips, American musician
Rory Phillips (DJ), English disc jockey
Rowan Ricardo Phillips (born 1974), American poet
Rowland Phillips (disambiguation), multiple people
Roy Phillips (born 1941), British musician
Rubel Phillips (1925–2011), American politician
Ruby Hart Phillips (1898–1985), American news correspondent
Rudy Phillips (born 1958), American football player
Rufus Phillips (1929–2021), American writer and businessman
Rupie Phillips (born 1969), American politician
Russell Phillips (1969–1995), American race car driver
Russell Phillips (ice hockey) (1888–1949), Canadian ice hockey player
Ruth Phillips, Canadian art historian
Ryan Phillips (disambiguation), multiple people

S
Sally Phillips (born 1970), British comic actress
Salma Phillips (born 1984), Nigerian writer
Sam Phillips (disambiguation), multiple people
Samuel Phillips (disambiguation), multiple people
Sandra S. Phillips (born 1945), American writer
Sarah Phillips (disambiguation), multiple people
Saul Phillips (disambiguation), multiple people
Scott Phillips (disambiguation), multiple people
Scottie Phillips (born 1997), American football player
Sean Phillips (disambiguation), multiple people
Sewall A. Phillips (1839–??), American politician
Shannon Phillips (born 1975), Canadian politician
Shaun Phillips (born 1981), American football player
Shawn Phillips (born 1943), American singer-songwriter
Shilah Phillips, American entertainer
Siân Phillips (born 1933), Welsh actress
Sian Phillips (folk musician), Welsh musician
Sid Phillips (disambiguation), multiple people
Sidney Phillips (1924–2015), American Marine
Simeon Phillips (1847–1925), Australian politician
Simon Phillips (disambiguation), multiple people
Stanley Phillips (1891–1954), British philatelist
Stanley Davis Phillips (1942–2022), American ambassador
Stephen Phillips (disambiguation), multiple people
Steve Phillips (disambiguation), multiple people
Stewart Phillips (born 1961), English footballer
Stone Phillips (born 1954), American television correspondent
Stu Phillips (disambiguation), multiple people
Susan Phillips (disambiguation), multiple people
Susanna Phillips, American singer
Syd Phillips (1874–1960), Australian rules footballer

T
Tappy Phillips (born 1948), American news correspondent
Tari Phillips (born 1969), American basketball player
Ta'Shia Phillips (born 1989), American basketball player
Taylor Phillips (born 1933), American football player
Ted Phillips, American businessman and sports executive
Ted Phillips (footballer) (1933–2018), English footballer
Tenaya Phillips (born 1994), Australian basketball player
T. E. R. Phillips (1868–1942), English astronomer
Teresa Phillips (born 1958), American athletic administrator
Teresia Constantia Phillips (1709–1765), British courtesan
Terry Phillips (born 1953), American journalist
Terry Don Phillips, American football player and administrator
Thomas Phillips (disambiguation), multiple people
Thompson Phillips (1832–1909), Irish Archdeacon
Tim Phillips (disambiguation), multiple people
Todd Phillips (born 1970), American film director
Todd Phillips (musician) (born 1953), American bassist
Tom Phillips (disambiguation), multiple people
Toni Phillips, British disc jockey
Tony Phillips (disambiguation), multiple people
Traci Phillips (born 1962), American canoeist
Tracy Phillips, New Zealand high jumper
Trevor Phillips (disambiguation), multiple people
Trey Phillips (tennis) (born 1976), American tennis player
Tripp Phillips (born 1977), American tennis player
Tyre Phillips (born 1997), American football player
Tyrone Phillips (born 1994), Fijian rugby league footballer

U
Ulrich Bonnell Phillips (1877–1934), American historian
Utah Phillips (1935–2008), American labor organizer

V
Valerie Phillips, American photographer
Van Phillips (disambiguation), multiple people
Vel Phillips (1924–2018), American judge
Verno Phillips (born 1969), Belizean boxer
Vicki Phillips (born 1958), American educator
Vicky Phillips, British solicitor
Vince Phillips (born 1963), American boxer
Virginia A. Phillips (born 1957), American judge

W
Wade Phillips (born 1947), American football coach
Waite Phillips (1883–1964), American oilman and philanthropist
Wal Phillips (1908–1998), English motorcycle speedway racer
Wally Phillips (1925–2008), American radio personality
Walter Phillips (disambiguation), multiple people
Warren Phillips (disambiguation), multiple people
Washington Phillips (1880–1954), American singer
Watts Phillips (1825–1874), British illustrator
Wayne Phillips (disambiguation), multiple people
Waynne Phillips (born 1970), Welsh footballer
Wendell Phillips (disambiguation), multiple people
Wendy Phillips (born 1952), American actress
Wes Phillips (born 1979), American football player and coach
William Phillips (disambiguation), multiple people
Winifred Phillips, American musical composer

X
Xan Phillips, American poet
Xavier Phillips (born 1971), French cellist

Z
Zach Phillips (born 1986), Mexican-American baseball player
Zack Phillips (born 1992), Canadian ice hockey player
Zara Phillips (born 1981), British equestrian
ZeBarney Thorne Phillips (1875–1942), American chaplain
Zico Phillips (born 1991), Barbadian footballer

Fictional characters
Kane Phillips, a fictional character on the soap opera Home and Away

See also
Attorney General Phillips (disambiguation), a disambiguation page for Attorney Generals surnamed Phillips
Captain Phillips (disambiguation), a disambiguation page for Captains surnamed Phillips
General Phillips (disambiguation), a disambiguation page for Generals surnamed Phillips
Governor Phillips (disambiguation), a disambiguation page for Governors surnamed Phillips
Judge Phillips (disambiguation), a disambiguation page for Judges surnamed Phillips
Justice Phillips (disambiguation), a disambiguation page for Justices surnamed Phillips
Senator Phillips (disambiguation), a disambiguation page for Senators surnamed Phillips
Philips (surname), a disambiguation page for Philips
Philipps (disambiguation), a disambiguation page for Philipps
Phillips (disambiguation), a disambiguation page for Phillips
Phillipps, a disambiguation page for Phillipps

References

 
English-language surnames
Patronymic surnames
Surnames from given names